San Antonio station is a station on the Medellín Metro. It is the terminal station for line B (center to west), and a possible transfer station to line A (north to south). It is named after the Church of San Antonio, which also gives its name to the nearby San Antonio Plaza. Line A station was opened on 30 November 1995 as part of the inaugural section of line A, from Niquía to Poblado. Line B station was opened on 28 February 1996 as part of the inaugural section of the line, from San Javier to San Antonio.

References

External links
 Official site of Medellín Metro 

Medellín Metro stations
Railway stations opened in 1995
1995 establishments in Colombia